Leptoconops brevistylus is a species of biting midge belonging to the family Ceratopogonidae. It occurs in the Damodar River valley, Jarkhand state, India.

References

Leptoconops
Insects described in 2010
Diptera of Asia
Insects of India